Mitcham is a suburb of Melbourne, Victoria, Australia, 20 km east from Melbourne's Central Business District, located within the City of Whitehorse local government area. Mitcham recorded a population of 16,795 at the 2021 census.

History

Mitcham was named after Mitcham Grove, a farm property that was owned by William Slater, who grew roses and herbs for perfumes and remedies. From its settlement in the 1860s, the Mitcham area was generally used for orchards, brickmaking and pottery. Mitcham Post Office opened on 1 June 1884.

From its settlement in the 1860s, the Mitcham area was generally used for orchards, brickmaking and pottery.

A Heatherdale Post Office opened in 1948 and closed in 1971. The Mitcham North Post Office opened in 1960.

However, since the 1950s post war expansion, Mitcham has become a suburban area.

Demographics
In the 2016 census the population of Mitcham was 16,148, approximately 51.7% female and 48.3% male.

The median/average age of the people in Mitcham is 38 years of age.

Nearly two-thirds (64.2%) of people living in the suburb of Mitcham were born in Australia. The other top responses for country of birth were 6.7% China, 2.9% India, 2.8% England, 1.8% Malaysia and 1.3% New Zealand.

Two-thirds (67.9%) of people living in Mitcham speak English only. The other top languages spoken are Mandarin 8.9%, Cantonese 4.1%, Italian 1.4%, Vietnamese 1% and Persian 1%.

The religious makeup of Mitcham is 37.6% no religion, 19.5% Catholic, 7.7% not stated, Anglican 7.7% and Uniting Church 3.6%.

Facilities

The main shopping precinct is centered on the intersection of Whitehorse Road and Mitcham Road and features a supermarket, cafes, fast food outlets and speciality shops.

The main secondary school in Mitcham is Mullauna College, on the site of the old Mitcham High School.

Mitcham also has a number of parks and reserves, including:
 Yarran Dheran, a bushland park, located on the banks of Mullum Mullum Creek.
 Halliday Park, a public garden, which has a war memorial and large children's playground and is home to Bowls Victoria Premier Division's Mitcham Bowling Club.

 Walker Park, a sports reserve, which is home to Mitcham Cricket Club and Mitcham Football Club.
 Antonio Park, is seven hectares in size and includes a playground, walking trails, remnant bushland, a BBQ area and bird watching opportunities. History – The park is named after the Antonio family who were first associated with the land in 1892. The site of their original weekend shack is now part of the Antonio Park Primary School grounds. In the early 1900s the family bought what is now the main body of the park and built a permanent home in Deep Creek Road. Remnants of the garden are still present in the formal part of the Park. The family gifted the land to the former Nunawading Council in 1955, but members of the family lived there until 1963. The northern section of the park, known as the "New Lands" was purchased from Charles Schwerkolt in 1975 to replace the land sold to the Education Department for Antonio Park School.
 Mitcham Private Hospital
 Schwerkolt Cottage: Used to back onto Yarran Dheran via a track along the Mullum Mullum Creek.

Transport

The main north–south roads are Mitcham Road and Heatherdale Road. The main east–west road is Whitehorse Road (Maroondah Highway), which connects with the EastLink tolled freeway, which skirts the northern and eastern boundaries of the suburb.

Mitcham has two railways stations; Mitcham and Heatherdale, both of which are on the Belgrave and Lilydale railway lines.

There are a number of bus routes, which link the suburb to surrounding areas. Many of these connect with Mitcham railway station.

Attractions

Schwerkolt Cottage is a pioneer cottage (circa 1880s), near the Yarran Dheran bushland park. The cottage and other buildings are now a local history museum. The cottage is surrounded by 2.25 hectares of gardens and bushland. The stone cottage has been restored to its original condition and furnished in a style of the period. The Opening Hours; Weekends and Public Holidays, 2.00pm-5.00pm and Group Tours by appointment on weekdays only.

Schools
Antonio Park Primary School
Mitcham Primary School
Rangeview Primary School
Mullauna Secondary College
St Johns Catholic Primary School
Vermont Primary School

Movie history

Mitcham was a filming location for the world's first feature film, The Story of the Kelly Gang, which used the suburb in key scenes for the 1906 movie.

Sport

The suburb has two Australian Rules football teams. The first is the Mitcham Tigers, competing in the Eastern Football League. The second is the Mitcham Eagles, who compete in the Saturday Football League. Their home ground is at Heatherdale Reserve.

The Mitcham Connection

Mitcham was the home of comedian Dave O'Neil, The Volvos musicians Heynes Arms & AC Fanta, Sforzando lead vocalist, poet and writer Quincy Hall, actor brothers Brett and Trevor Lewis, playwright Sandra Long, writer Michael McArthur, director James McArthur, sculptor Joanne Mott and abstract artist 'Egghatch'. These and other Mitcham-raised artists have become collectively known as the Mitcham Connection. During the 1996 Melbourne International Comedy Festival, several of the Mitcham Connection artists, namely Sandra Long, the McArthur brothers and Quincy Hall, collaborated with several other playwrights and stage directors to produce the extraordinary show To Go at Something Bald-Headed. The show was composed of four plays, including The Harry Blade Show, featuring AC Fanta, Torquil Neilson and Anthony Rive. The show was officially launched by Democrats Senator Lyn Allison.

Notable people
 Chris Crewther - Politician
 Karl von Möller – director and cinematographer
 Dave O'Neil – comedian
 Sforzando vocalist Quincy Hall – singer, poet and writer
 Brett Lewis – actor
 Steve Darmody – rugby league player

See also
 City of Doncaster and Templestowe – Parts of Mitcham were previously within this former local government area.
 City of Nunawading – Parts of Mitcham were previously within this former local government area.

References

External links

 Schwerkolt Cottage and Museum Complex
 Victorial Electoral Commission
 Home Page Eastern Football League 

Suburbs of Melbourne
Suburbs of the City of Whitehorse